The Vandalia-Butler City School District serves Butler Township and Vandalia, in the U.S. state of Ohio, with an enrollment of about 3,500 students in 2005. The superintendent, as of 2017, is Robert O’Leary According to city-data.com the school system the second-strongest-rated district in the Dayton region, just behind Oakwood City Schools. The district has also won an excellent rating from the Ohio Department of Education every year since 2002 and received Excellent with Distinction, the highest rating possible for the 2008–2009 school year. The district was also named the best in Social Studies on standardized testing in the state of Ohio for 2005, 2006, 2007, 2008, 2009, 2010, and 2011.

Schools
Butler High School
Morton Middle School
Smith Middle School
Demmitt Elementary
Helke Elementary School

See also
List of school districts in Ohio

References

External links
Vandalia Butler City Schools

School districts in Ohio
Education in Montgomery County, Ohio